Tetragona dorsalis, known as abelha-bico-de-vidro ("glass-mouth bee") in Brazil, is a species of eusocial stingless bee in the family Apidae and tribe Meliponini.

References 

Meliponini
Hymenoptera of South America
Hymenoptera of Brazil
Insects described in 1854